Appenzell Creek is a  tributary of McMichael Creek in Monroe County, Pennsylvania in the United States.

The headwaters feed into Trout Lake in Jackson Township at the Poconos. It meanders in a southwestern direction and joins McMichael Creek just above Sciota.

Known to locals as Pensyl Creek, it takes its name from Henry Pensyl, a hunter and trapper who lived in the area in the 18th century. Pensyl Creek Road follows the creek as it flows from the village of Neola to the village of Snydersville.

See also
List of rivers of Pennsylvania

References

Rivers of Pennsylvania
Pocono Mountains
Tributaries of Brodhead Creek
Rivers of Monroe County, Pennsylvania